This is a list of African-American newspapers that have been published in New Mexico.

Newspapers

See also 

List of African-American newspapers and media outlets
List of African-American newspapers in Arizona
List of African-American newspapers in Colorado
List of African-American newspapers in Oklahoma
List of African-American newspapers in Texas
List of African-American newspapers in Utah
List of newspapers in New Mexico

Works cited

References 

Newspapers
New Mexico
African-American
African-American newspapers